The Golden Melody Award for Best Taiwanese Album is an honor presented at the Golden Melody Awards, a ceremony that was established in 1990, to recording artists for quality Hokkien pop music albums. 

The honor was first presented in 2005 as Best Taiwanese Pop Vocal Album at the 16th Golden Melody Awards to Jody Chiang for Love. In 2007, the category became known as Best Taiwanese Album. Chiang currently holds the record for the most nominations and awards, with seven and four respectively.

Recipients

References 

Golden Melody Awards
Album awards